Dworzysk may refer to the following places:
Dworzysk, Białystok County in Podlaskie Voivodeship (north-east Poland)
Dworzysk, Gmina Sokółka in Podlaskie Voivodeship (north-east Poland)
Dworzysk, Gmina Sidra in Podlaskie Voivodeship (north-east Poland)